Langley Park School for Boys is a boys secondary academy school in Beckenham in the London Borough of Bromley, with a co-ed sixth form. On 31 March 2011, the school converted from a Foundation School to an academy and its current status is that of an "Academy Converter".

Location
It is situated near Eden Park and the Bethlem Royal Hospital on Hawksbrook Lane close to the boundary of the London Borough of Bromley with the London Borough of Croydon. Construction for the new school building was completed in December 2011, and the staff and pupils moved into the building in January 2012, following which the old buildings were demolished.

Admissions
At 11+, admission to the school is according to the London Borough of Bromley education admissions procedures.
At 16+, the school has changed its admissions policy and it is now also dependent on the proximity of the pupil's home to the school.
At 16+, the school is co-educational.

Sport
Langley Park School for Boys is one of the few state schools that play rugby and hockey, and is one of the top three hockey schools in the country, having competed in the last four national finals.

In 2004 the under-16 team were crowned national champions, the first comprehensive school to achieve this.

In the 2021 Cricket season, the 1st XI won the Kent cup beating out Simon Langton Grammar School for Boys by 33 runs after 35 overs.

In 2021/22, the U15 rugby squad made it to the semi-finals of the Schools Vase, where they lost to Torquay Boys Grammar School. Despite the match ending in a 12-12 draw and taking place in a neutral venue, Torquay went through as they were drawn to be the away side in this tie, following standard tiebreaker practice in previous rounds.

The new buildings for the school provide private hockey facilities for the school, which are currently being shared with Langley Park School for Girls. Other sports include tennis, basketball, football and table tennis.

Music 
Langley Park School for Boys' music department offers groups from the traditional concert band, chamber orchestra, brass band and choir, to world music styles, including a Cuban band and an African drumming group.

In 2013, the brass band was one of the finalists of the national Music for Youth competition who were selected to perform at Royal Albert Hall. The band played in the Primary Proms show, and performed Take That's "Shine", the theme from The Magnificent Seven and Concierto de Aranjuez.

History 
The school was originally the Beckenham Technical Institute, opening in 1901 and situated in what is now Venue 28, Beckenham. The school went through a variety of name changes in its early days: the Technical Day School, Beckenham; Beckenham Secondary School; Beckenham County School for Boys; Beckenham and Penge County School for Boys; in 1944 it was the Beckenham and Penge County Grammar School under headmaster L.W. White, MA (Cantab). In 1950 the school was mentioned in Nature (journal) the scientific journal. The article in Nature explained that a periodical named "Beckenham and Penge Grammar School : Scientific Society Proceedings" existed in which scientific work done by the boys was reported. By 1954 it was called Beckenham and Penge Grammar School for Boys.

An increase in size meant the school moved to new buildings in High St, Penge, in 1931. It moved from Penge to its present location in Eden Park, Beckenham, in January 1969, at which point it adopted its current name. Around 1973 or 1974 Langley Park School for Boys converted from Grammar to a Comprehensive intake school, as many others did, in line with the policies of Labour Education Secretary Shirley Williams and the Comprehensive intake, including streaming, worked its way up the age-groups through subsequent years. In the late 1980s, schools could opt out of local government control by becoming a Grant-maintained school which were funded by a direct grant of money from the central government. This new arrangement enabled schools to have greater control of their finances than they would have had under local government control. Hansard indicates that a ballot of parents occurred on 8 March 1991 regarding the question of the school becoming a "grant maintained school". The school was given a grant of £60,000 as a transitional grant.

The school outgrew its present accommodation and a completely new building was constructed adjacent to the location of the former school, which was occupied from January 2012.

The school motto, Mores et Studia, means "good character and learning".

Headteachers
The school started in 1901, as the Beckenham Technical Institute at a site close to Beckenham's public baths the headmaster was Mr C.T.F. Watts, in 1931 he was replaced by Mr Sidney Gammon who had been at the Windsor County School. On 23 October 1940 Mr Gammon was killed by a bomb dropped during the war, he lived at 9 Foxgrove Avenue and his estate was valued at £4271 18 s and 5d.

Mr Gammon was replaced by Mr L.W. White who was appointed in September 1941. In December 1962, Mr white retired and was replaced with Mr D.A. Raeburn.

Five terms after the school relocated to its current site, off South Eden Park Road, headmaster David A. Raeburn retired, and was replaced by B.A. Phythian (a master from the Manchester Grammar School and a successful academic author), who led the school as it converted to comprehensive status. Brian Phythian had written and edited books on English language, and a book on the Manchester Grammar School. In 1993 on 23 March Brian Arthur Phythian of Brackenden Leafy Grove (Keston) died.

In December 1989, Brian Phythian was succeeded by R.V.P. Sheffield, who was in the post until 1999, leaving the school under allegations of financial irregularities. The deputy headteacher, K McGregor, took over as acting headteacher until the appointment of R Northcott in 2001, who retired in July 2013. It is stated in the 1990 year book that Mr Sheffield had a degree in Psychology from the University of Nottingham and a MEd from Birmingham University. The yearbook also states that Mr Sheffield was working in a school in Waddington before being senior master at a school in Worcester in 1978, in 1984 he became deputy head at Newent School. In July 2022, Steve Parsons resigned as Headmaster. He had an eight-year tenure, beginning in September 2013.

The current headteacher is Richard Guy, who is acting as an interim, and begun in September 2022.

Notable former pupils 

 Bradley Pritchard, former Charlton Athletic footballer
 Rory Allen, former Tottenham Hotspur and Portsmouth footballer
 Harold Sydney Bride, wireless operator on the RMS Titanic
 Norman Hunter, writer, creator of Professor Branestawm
 Robert Key, former England cricketer and Kent County Cricket Club captain
 Henry Mee, artist
 John Tyndall, Neo-Nazi political activist
 David Case, air commodore, highest ranking black officer in the British Forces
 Jack McManus, singer/songwriter
 Tom Misch, singer, songwriter, producer
 Matt Hankin, English rugby union player
 Nick Land, English philosopher
 Ben Phillips, former Kent cricketer

Beckenham and Penge County Grammar School

 Hugh Bean CBE, professor of violin at the Royal College of Music 1954–2003
 Carey Blyton, composer of Bananas in Pyjamas
 Air Vice-Marshal Ronald Dick CB, station commander of RAF Honington 1978–80, and head of British Defence Staff – US 1984–88
 Michael Finnissy, composer and professor of composition since 1999 at the University of Southampton
 Patrick Ground, Conservative MP for Feltham and Heston 1983–92
 John Clifford Strong CBE, Governor of the Turks and Caicos Islands 1978–82
 Derek Underwood, Kent and England bowler (known as "Deadly" by the Australians)
 Bill Wyman, musician, ex-member of the Rolling Stones
 Keith Lewin, professor of international education and director of the Centre for International Education at the University of Sussex

See also 
 Langley Park School for Girls

Notes

External links 
It owns a converted church in Youlgreave, used for school trips involving visits to Alton Towers, sporting, and other leisure activities.

There is also a regularly-used location within Dover that the school uses for a Year 9 trip.

References

External links
 Langley Park School for Boys website

Boys' schools in London
Academies in the London Borough of Bromley
Educational institutions established in 1901
1901 establishments in England
Secondary schools in the London Borough of Bromley